Mack Elwin Barham (June 18, 1924 – November 27, 2006) was justice of the Louisiana Supreme Court from 1968 to 1975.

References

1924 births
2006 deaths
Louisiana state court judges
Justices of the Louisiana Supreme Court
Louisiana city judges
Politicians from New Orleans
Louisiana State University Law Center alumni
University of Colorado alumni
Politicians from Monroe, Louisiana
Tulane University faculty
Tulane University Law School faculty
People from Bastrop, Louisiana
People from Covington, Louisiana
Lawyers from New Orleans
20th-century American judges
20th-century American lawyers